Petra Pravlíková (born 4 June 1985 in Levoča, Czechoslovakia) is a Slovakian ice hockey forward.

International career
Pravlíková was selected for the Slovakia national women's ice hockey team in the 2010 Winter Olympics. She played in all five games, scoring two goals. She played in the qualifying campaigns for the 2010 and 2014 Olympics.

Pravlíková has also appeared for Slovakia at eight IIHF Women's World Championships, across three levels. Her first appearance came in 2004. She appeared at the top level championships in 2011.

Career statistics

International career

References

External links
Eurohockey.com Profile
Sports-Reference Profile

1985 births
Living people
Ice hockey players at the 2010 Winter Olympics
Olympic ice hockey players of Slovakia
People from Levoča
Sportspeople from the Prešov Region
Slovak women's ice hockey forwards
Universiade medalists in ice hockey
Universiade bronze medalists for Slovakia
Competitors at the 2011 Winter Universiade
HC Tornado players
Slovak expatriate ice hockey players in Russia
Slovak expatriate ice hockey players in Switzerland
Slovak expatriate ice hockey players in Germany
Slovak expatriate ice hockey players in Sweden
Slovak expatriate sportspeople in Hungary
Slovak expatriate sportspeople in Belarus
Expatriate ice hockey players in Hungary
Expatriate ice hockey players in Belarus